The Aurora Winter Train, operated by the Alaska Railroad, provides passenger service between the cities of Anchorage and Fairbanks, Alaska. It is a seasonal train, only operating during the non-summer months. It is similar to the Hurricane Turn in that in addition to its scheduled stops it makes flag stops, making its schedule unpredictable. The northbound train operates on Saturdays, while the southbound train operates on Sundays.

Station Stops
The Aurora Winter Train makes the following scheduled stops

Anchorage
Wasilla
Talkeetna
Chase
Curry
Deadhorse
Sherman
Gold Creek
Canyon
Twin Bridges
Chulitna
Hurricane
Denali
Healy
Nenana
Fairbanks

References

Passenger trains of the Alaska Railroad
Passenger rail transportation in Alaska
Railway services introduced in 1947